State Route 774 (SR 774) is a  state highway in Esmeralda County, Nevada, United States.  It is known as Gold Point Road, connecting the town of Gold Point to State Route 266.  The route was originally part of former State Route 71.

Route description

The highway begins at Third Street in the middle of Gold Point.

History

Gold Point Road first shows up on state highway maps in 1942 as State Route 71, an unimproved highway. The alignment followed that of the present-day SR 774 and extended further southwest of Gold Point to the California state line.  With no major road or town connection beyond Gold Point into California, the southern end of SR 71 was truncated to Gold Point by 1968.

SR 71 was renumbered to State Route 774 on July 1, 1976, a change which first appeared on the state highway map in 1978.

SR 774 regularly appears on state highway maps beginning with the 1991–92 edition. By that time, it was the only state-maintained highway in Nevada that had not been constructed into a paved highway. Paving had taken place by 2002.

Major intersections
Note: The route's mileposts are assigned from north to south.

See also

References

774
Transportation in Esmeralda County, Nevada